General Sir Joseph John Asser,  (31 August 1867 – 4 February 1949) was a British Army officer.

Early career
Asser was born on 31 August 1867, the son of S. B. V. Asser of Windlesham, Surrey. He entered the Dorsetshire Regiment in 1887 and was appointed aide-de-camp to the General Officer Commanding, Egypt in 1892. He served in the Nile expedition of 1897 and was awarded the medal and clasp; in 1898 he was promoted to captain. For his service in the Nile expedition of 1898 he was granted the brevet rank of major and awarded the medal with two clasps, and for the Nile expedition of 1899 a further clasp. He was promoted to the substantive rank of major in 1907 and to lieutenant colonel the same year. From 1907 to 1914 he was adjutant-general of the Egyptian Army; during this period he commanded the Southern Kordofan expedition in 1910, for which he was awarded the medal and clasp. He was also an Egyptian pasha and a member for some years of the Sudan Government Council.

First World War

Asser retired from the Army in July 1914 but returned to service on the outbreak of war that year. He served as a base commandant, as General Officer Commanding (GOC) Lines of Communication area, and as GOC of the British Troops in France and Flanders in 1919. For his First World War service he was mentioned in despatches, restored to the active list as a major general in 1916 and further promoted to lieutenant general, awarded the Companion of the Order of the Bath in 1915, the Knight Commander of the Order of St Michael and St George in 191), the Russian Order of St Anne with crossed swords and the Belgian Order of the Crown.

Post-war
Asser was Governor and Commander-in-Chief of Bermuda from 1922 to 1927 and was promoted to full general in 1926. He was an aide-de-camp general to the King from 1929 to 1930, the year in which he was placed on retired pay. He received the Knight Commander of the Royal Victorian Order in 1917, the Knight Commander of the Order of the Bath in 1924, the second class of the Order of Osmanieh, the second class of the Order of the Mejidie, the Order of the Sacred Treasure, the Order of Aviz, the French Croix de guerre, the Belgian Croix de guerre and was a Grand Officier of the Legion of Honour.

Asser lived at The Old Vicarage, Hambledon, Hampshire. He was a member of the Army and Navy Club and an honorary member of the Phi Beta Kappa Society at the College of William & Mary, Virginia. In Who's Who he listed his recreations as shooting, fishing and golf. He was married in 1901 to Leila, daughter of James Wotherspoon of New York; they had one daughter. He died on 4 February 1949.

References

1867 births
1949 deaths
British Army generals
Governors of Bermuda
Egyptian pashas
British Army personnel of the Mahdist War
British Army generals of World War I
Dorset Regiment officers
Knights Commander of the Order of the Bath
Knights Commander of the Order of St Michael and St George
Knights Commander of the Royal Victorian Order
Recipients of the Order of St. Anna
Recipients of the Order of the Crown (Belgium)
Recipients of the Order of the Medjidie, 2nd class
Grand Officiers of the Légion d'honneur
Recipients of the Croix de Guerre 1914–1918 (France)
Recipients of the Croix de guerre (Belgium)